Agrikolyansky (masculine) or Agrikolyanskaya (feminine) is a Russian last name. It was artificially created from the Latin word meaning rural, and was used in Russian Orthodox seminaries.

References

Notes

Sources
И. М. Ганжина (I. M. Ganzhina). "Словарь современных русских фамилий" (Dictionary of Modern Russian Last Names). Москва, 2001. 



Russian-language surnames